SS Isaac M. Singer was a Liberty ship built in the United States during World War II. She was named after Isaac M. Singer, an American inventor, actor, and businessman. He made important improvements in the design of the sewing machine and was the founder of what became one of the first American multi-national businesses, the Singer Sewing Machine Company.

Construction
Isaac M. Singer was laid down on 17 October 1944, under a Maritime Commission (MARCOM) contract, MC hull 2506, by the St. Johns River Shipbuilding Company, Jacksonville, Florida; she was sponsored by Mrs. William C. Calvin, the wife of the president of the International Brotherhood of Boilermakers and Iron Shippbuilders of America, and was launched on 19 November 1944.

History
She was allocated to the Moore-McCormack Lines, Inc., on 27 November 1944. On 20 September 1948, she was laid up in the National Defense Reserve Fleet, Mobile, Alabama. She was removed from the fleet, 28 May 1970.

References

Bibliography

 
 
 
 

 

Liberty ships
Ships built in Jacksonville, Florida
1944 ships
Mobile Reserve Fleet